Brother Sebastian was an American pantomime gag cartoon series, created by Chon Day. It ran from 1954 until 1971 in Look. The cartoons center on a spectacled Roman Catholic monk. All cartoons are one-panel and although occasionally signs are used there is no use of dialogue, making it a classic example of a pantomime comic.

Books
These cartoons were collected in several Doubleday books, Brother Sebastian, Brother Sebastian Carries On and Brother Sebastian at Large (1961), reprinted in paperback by Pocket Books.

Day received the National Cartoonists Society's Special Features Award for 1969 for his work on Brother Sebastian cartoons.

References

External links
National Cartoonists Society Awards

American comic strips
Christian comics
Pantomime comics
Sebastian
1954 comics debuts
1971 comics endings
Gag cartoon comics
Gag-a-day comics
Comics characters introduced in 1954
Male characters in comics